Miss Earth Reunion is a national Beauty pageant in Reunion Island. The winner of Miss Earth Reunion obtains the right to represent the region in the Miss Earth pageant, the third most important beauty festival in the world, where the goal is to promote environmental protection.

Titleholders
This list includes all the representatives of Reunion Island including the representatives sent by the previous license holders. 
Color key

Notes

2014
Chloé Booz, Miss Earth Air Reunion 2014, succeed to Julie Nauche and will represent Reunion Island in Miss Supranational 2014 pageant.

Emeline Latchimy, Miss Earth Water Reunion 2014, succeed to Coraline Blas and will represent France in Miss Tourism World pageant.

2013
Coraline Blas is nominated as Miss Tourism France and represented the country in Miss Tourism World 2013 in Equatoria Guinea.

References

External links 
Miss Earth Indian Ocean official Facebook page

Reunion
Réunion